Chalcosyrphus (Xylotomima) chalybeus  (Weidemann, 1830), the Violet Leafwalker, is a fairly common species of syrphid fly observed in the Northeastern United States. Hoverflies can remain nearly motionless in flight. The adults are also known as flower flies for they are commonly found on flowers, from which they get both energy-giving nectar and protein-rich pollen.

Distribution
Canada, United States.

References

Eristalinae
Insects described in 1830
Diptera of North America
Taxa named by Christian Rudolph Wilhelm Wiedemann